The Great Heist is a 2020 Colombian web television mini-series starring Marcela Benjumea, Paula Castaño and Andres Parra.

Premise
The show is a dramatic interpretation based on the true story of the 1994 heist of the robbery of the national bank El Banco de la Republica (Bank of the Republic) in Valledupar, where the criminals escaped with 33 million US dollars.

Cast 
 Marcela Benjumea
 Paula Castaño
 Andres Parra
 Christian Tappan
 Waldo Urrego

Episodes

Release
The Great Heist was released on 14 August 2020 on Netflix.

References
Newspaper report at the time

External links
 
 

Spanish-language Netflix original programming
2020 Colombian television series debuts
Colombian drama television series
Television series set in the 1990s